Edward Albert Myles (25 September 1865, Limerick - 7 May 1951, Banbridge) was an Anglican priest in Ireland during the late 19th century and the first half of the 20th century

Myles was educated at Trinity College, Dublin. He was ordained deacon in 1889 and priest in 1890. He began his career with  curacies in Donaghcloney, Belfast and Seapatrick. He was the incumbent at Tullylish from 1896 until his death. He was appointed  Dean of Dromore in 1933, serving until 1950.

References

19th-century Irish Anglican priests
20th-century Irish Anglican priests
1951 deaths
Alumni of Trinity College Dublin
Deans of Dromore
1865 births